Mammea americana, commonly known as mammee, mammee apple, mamey, mamey apple, Santo Domingo apricot, tropical apricot, or South American apricot, is an evergreen tree of the family Calophyllaceae, whose fruit is edible. It has also been classified as belonging to the family Guttiferae Juss. (1789), which would make it a relative of the mangosteen.

In certain Latin American countries, Mammea americana is referred to as "yellow mamey"  to distinguish it from the unrelated but similar-looking Pouteria sapota, whose fruit is usually called "red mamey" ( or ).

Description

Tree

Its trunk is short and reaches  in diameter. The tree's upright branches form an oval head. Its dark-green foliage is quite dense, with opposite, leathery, elliptical leaves.

The flowers are borne either singly or in clusters of two or three, on short stalks. A single flower can have pistils, stamens, or both, so flowers can be male, female or hermaphrodite on one tree.

Fruit

The mammee apple is a berry, though it is often misinterpreted to be a drupe. It is round or slightly irregular, with a brown or grey-brown 3-mm-thick rind. In fact, the rind consists of the exocarp and mesocarp of the fruit, while the pulp is formed from the endocarp. The stem is thick and short. The mammee apple has more or less visible floral remnant at the apex.

When unripe, the fruit is hard and heavy, but its flesh slightly softens when fully ripe. Beneath the skin is a white, dry membrane, whose taste is astringent, and adheres to the flesh. The flesh is orange or yellow, not fibrous, and can have various textures (crispy or juicy, firm, or tender). Generally, the flesh smell is pleasant and appetizing.

Small fruits contain a single seed, while larger ones might have up to four. The juice of the seed leaves an indelible stain.

Propagation
Propagation can be done by seed. Germination takes place from 60–260 days. Grafting is the preferred method of propagation.

Distribution and habitat
Native to the Caribbean the tree is also widely cultivated in the tropics and Central America. 
In Haiti the fruit is known as zabriko or abricot. 
In 1529, it was included by Oviedo in his Review of the Fruits of the New World. It was then introduced to various regions in the Old World: West Africa, particularly Sierra Leone, Zanzibar, Southeast Asia, and Hawaii. In the United States, the species is uniquely found in Hawaii and Florida. In the latter state, mammee apples were probably introduced from the Bahamas.

The mammea apple tree is confined to tropical or subtropical climates. In Central America, the species is found to grow up to an altitude of 1,000 m. It thrives best in rich, deep, and well-drained soil, but is very adaptive; it also grows on limestone in Jamaica, in the oolithic limestone of the Bahamas, and on ancient coral bedrock in Barbados, as well as coral cays off the coast of Florida.

The tree is very sensitive to low temperatures, but seems remarkably resistant to pests and diseases.

Uses

Traditional medicine
In Trinidad and Tobago, the grated seeds are mixed with rum or coconut oil to treat head lice and chiggers.

Underripe fruits are rich in pectin, and the tree bark is high in tannin.

Culinary interest
Though edible, this fruit has received little attention worldwide.

The raw flesh can be served in fruit salads, or with wine, sugar, or cream, especially in Jamaica. In the Bahamas, the flesh is first put in salted water to remove its bitterness, before cooking it with much sugar to make a sort of jam. The flesh can also be consumed stewed.

This liqueur is believed to be tonic or digestive.

Other
Various parts of the tree contain insecticidal substances, especially the seed kernel. In Puerto Rico, mammee leaves are wrapped around young tomato plants to keep mole crickets and cutworms away. In a similar way, the bark gum is melted with fat in Jamaica and Mexico, then applied to the feet to repel chiggers or fleas on animals. The same effect is also obtained from infusions of half-ripe fruits.

In the Virgin Islands, the tannin from the bark is used to tan leather. The mammee timber is heavy and hard, yet easy to work; it has received, however, only limited commercial interest.

References

Further reading
Mendes, John (1986). Cote ce Cote la: Trinidad & Tobago Dictionary. Arima, Trinidad.

External links

americana
Tropical agriculture
Trees of the Caribbean
Medicinal plants
Plants described in 1753
Taxa named by Carl Linnaeus
Flora without expected TNC conservation status